"Inget stoppar oss nu", also known as "Inget kan stoppa oss nu" or "I natt, i natt", is a song written by Lasse Holm and Ingela "Pling" Forsman, and originally intended to be performed by Haakon Pedersen at Melodifestivalen 1987. The song never entered the contest, but instead he recorded it for the album Nattens drottning from 1989.

Dansband standard
In the springtime of 1989, the song was recorded by Canyons orkester for Mariann Grammofon,  (number: tmcs045). The song also topped Skånetoppen in 1990. In 1990, it was also recorded by Trastinis (B-side). A live recording by Stefan Borsch orkester on the 1990 video album Te' dans me' Stefan Borsch orkester was also done.

In 1991, Black Jack scored a major hit with the song, releasing it as a single in 1990, with "I ett lusthus" as B-side. It was also recorded for the 1990 movie soundtrack album  Black Jack in 1990 from the film Blackjack ant for the film with the same name.

In 1991, Kikki Danielsson also recorded the song on the album "Vägen hem till dej", and the same year Drifters with Marie Arturén recorded the song as a B-side for the single "Säg varför". Även Leif Norbergs (single) and Mats Bergmans recorded the song the same year. In the same year, the song was also recorded by Contrazt, Tottes and Cheeries, while Christie. recorded the song the upcoming year

In 2001, Halländers recorded the song.

At Dansbandskampen 2008 the song was used during the finals, and performed by Larz-Kristerz and Scotts, where Larz Kristerz won. Scotts performed the song using an acoustic arrangement, which in 2009 was at the album Längtan. It was also recorded by CC & Lee for the album Gåva till dig in 2009.

At Dansbandskampen 2010, the song was performed Jeppez & the Cowboys. Before the penultimate program the song was performed, outside any competition, by Elisas, Patrik's Combo and Willez.

Other recordings
Black Ingvars recorded a 1995 recording at "Inget stoppar oss nu" on the album "Earcandy Six", and the same year Flintstens med Stanley also recorded the song.
At Körslaget 2009 the song was performed by Stefan Nykvist's choir from Älvdalen.
Anne-Lie Rydé recorded the song on the 2010 album Dans på rosor.

References

1987 songs
Kikki Danielsson songs
Swedish songs
Swedish-language songs
Songs written by Lasse Holm
Songs with lyrics by Ingela Forsman
Scotts (band) songs
Drifters (Swedish band) songs
Anne-Lie Rydé songs